Dan Theodorescu is an American physician and academic. He is the Director of the Samuel Oschin Comprehensive Cancer Institute at the Cedars-Sinai Medical Center and leader of Cedars-Sinai CANCER. From 2010 until 2018, Theodorescu was Director of the University of Colorado Cancer Center and a professor of Surgery-Urology.  He has been appointed Paul Mellon Chair at the University of Virginia and Paul Bunn Chair and Distinguished University Professor at the University of Colorado.

Education
Theodorescu earned a medical degree from Queen's University at Kingston in 1986, followed by a doctorate from the University of Toronto in 1991. His post degree training was a residency in urology from the University of Toronto in 1994 and a fellowship in urologic oncology at Memorial Sloan Kettering Cancer Center in 1995.

Memberships
Theodorescu is an elected member of the American Society for Clinical Investigation, Association of American Physicians, the American Association of Genitourinary Surgeons, the American Surgical Association, and the National Academy of Medicine.

He is an Honorary Fellow of the American Association for the Advancement of Science. He is also a founding co-editor in chief of the journal Bladder Cancer.

Research
Theodorescu is known for his work on the molecular mechanisms driving bladder cancer, discovery of tools that determine drug response and new therapeutics. Examples of his research include examining genes that regulate tumor growth and metastasis such as RhoGDI2 and biomarkers and approaches to precision medicine. He led the work on the “first in class” RalGTPase inhibitor as a new therapeutic in cancer. He has published work showing DDR2 as a target for effective combination immunotherapy with checkpoint inhibitors  and the presence of a new cellular subtype in bladder tumors, called “C3”, shown to predict response to immune checkpoint therapy.

Awards and distinctions
Meritorious Achievement Award from The Society for Basic Urologic Research (SBUR), 2019
Barringer Medal, American Association of Genitourinary Surgeons, 2015
Honorary Member Brazilian Cancer Society, 2014

References 

Living people
Year of birth missing (living people)
Bladder cancer
National Cancer Centers
Members of the National Academy of Medicine
Physicians of the Cedars-Sinai Medical Center
University of Colorado people
University of Virginia people
Queen's University at Kingston alumni
University of Toronto alumni